Parliamentary elections were held in Libya on 25 June 2014 for the House of Representatives. Whilst all candidates ran as independents, the elections saw nationalist and liberal factions win the majority of seats, with Islamist groups being reduced to only around 30 seats. Election turnout was very low at 18%.

After the election was complete, two constitutional claims were brought before the Libyan Supreme Court (LSC). On 7 November 2014 the LSC ruled the amendment to Article 11 of paragraph 30 of the Constitutional Declaration invalid, which set out the road map for Libya's transition and the House elections. This in extension invalidated the entire legislative and elective process leading to the establishment of the House including the election. Therefore, this meant the House was effectively dissolved.

Due to controversy about constitutional amendments the House refused to take office from General National Congress (GNC) in Tripoli, which was controlled by powerful militias from the western coastal city of Misrata. Instead, they established their parliament in Tobruk.

The international community through the United Nations Support Mission in Libya (UNSMIL) announced recognition of the House and thus ignored the Supreme Court ruling. It was seen as unrealistic at the time to dissolve the House.

Background
The General National Congress was elected in July 2012, with the responsibility of forming a constituent assembly to write the constitution. However, the National Transitional Council decided that Libyans would instead directly elect the constituent assembly. The General National Congress came to agreement on 10 April 2013 that constituent assembly members would be elected; the election for most of the constituent assembly took place on 20 February 2014.

On 25 May 2014, the General National Congress set 25 June 2014 as the date for elections to the House of Representatives. Article 16 of the Electoral Law voted by the GNC on 30 March 2014 with 124 votes in favour out of 133, allocated 30 seats for women, and 200 seats overall, with individuals able to run as members of political parties, but without party lists, and declared Libyans with a second nationality to be eligible.

Electoral system
The 200 seats were elected in 13 constituencies divided into 75 sub-constituencies. In an attempt to reduce tensions, all candidates contested the election as individuals, instead of running on party lists.

Conduct

Turnout

Turnout was a mere 18%, down from 60% in the first post-Gaddafi election of July 2012, with only 630,000 people voting. Barely a third of Libya's 3.4 million eligible voters had registered for the country's Constitutional Assembly election in February. "Declining enthusiasm reflects growing disgust with the authorities' failure to govern," said The Economist.

No voting took place in Derna, which had been the scene of a campaign of bombings and assassinations from radical Islamist groups based there. Some polling stations were also closed in Kufra and Sabha for security reasons.

Violence
There were several instances of violence on the day of the election, with at least five people dying in clashes between government forces and militants in Benghazi. According to security officials the deaths happened when Islamist insurgents opened fire on a local security headquarters, with the violence resulting in at least another 30 people being wounded.

In a separate incident Human Rights activist Salwa Bughaighis was shot dead at her Benghazi home after having returned home from voting. Her attackers were reportedly hooded and were wearing military uniforms. Bughaighis, a native of Benghazi, was a lawyer by profession and had three children. She had played an active role in the overthrow of Gaddafi and had served as a member of Libya's interim National Transitional Council.

Results
The results were announced on 22 July 2014. All 1,714 candidates stood as independents as party lists were forbidden under the electoral system. Of the 200 seats up for election, 188 were announced on 22 July, with the announcement for the other 12 being delayed due to boycott or insecurity in some electoral districts. Most of the seats were taken by secular factions, with Islamists only winning around 30 seats. Some analysts immediately feared the results could reinvigorate fighting between secular and Islamist forces.

On 12 August 2014, the parliament voted in favor of the Libyan head of state being directly elected, as opposed to being appointed by the House of Representatives. Of the Representatives present 141 voted in favour, with 2 opposing and 1 abstaining.

After the Islamist coup of 23 August 2014, the parliament moved to the Operation Dignity stronghold of Tobruk.

Key results include the following.

Aftermath
In November, the Supreme Court annulled the election after an appeal by a group of unnamed MPs on unclear grounds. However, the appealing MPs asserted unconstitutionality as the parliament does not sit in Tripoli or Benghazi and that it had overstepped its authority by calling for foreign military assistance against the national infighting with the militias. Though it cannot be appealed, the Tobruk-based parliament rejected the ruling on the claim that it was delivered "under the threat of arms." MP Abu Bakr Baira added that the ruling was "baseless" and "a step towards dividing the country," he further said that the Tobruk-based parliament would not comply with it. It was met with celebratory gunfire in Tripoli, the seat of the rival and competing Islamist-dominated government.

In further developments, former leader Gaddafi's cousin, Ahmed Gaddaf al-Dam, said that once the "government's" forces regain control of major cities many of the exiled supporters of Gaddafi, who were in talks with parliament, would return to get "Libya back from this mess" and support a national reconciliation programme.

References

Libya
2014 in Libya
2014
June 2014 events in Africa
Election and referendum articles with incomplete results